Whoopi is an American sitcom created by Bonnie and Terry Turner, starring Whoopi Goldberg that aired for one season on NBC. The series premiered on September 9, 2003, and ran until April 20, 2004. It was canceled by NBC in May 2004. The series revolved around the events and people at her hotel, the fictional Larchmont Hotel, in New York City.

Premise
Whoopi Goldberg starred in this comedy as one-hit wonder Mavis Rae, a cigarette-smoking, alcohol-drinking, menopausal and especially opinionated hotelier. In 1986, Mavis had one huge, spectacular hit song, the two-time Grammy Award-winning  "Don't Hide Love". Quickly realizing that her initial success was a fluke, she parlayed her finances from that hit into purchasing the Lamont Hotel in Manhattan.

Mavis operates the hotel on her charm and wit while assisted by Iran native Nasim (Omid Djalili) and Eastern European housekeeper Jadwiga (Gordana Rashovich), who share a love-hate relationship with each other. Staying at the hotel is her baby brother Courtney (Wren T. Brown), a moderate Republican attorney who is attempting to get back on his feet after being laid off from Enron amidst its bankruptcy scandal. Courtney begins dating medical imager Rita Nash (Elizabeth Regen), who spoke jive and was portrayed with an exaggerated urban black stereotype despite the fact that she was white. Rita and Mavis frequently clashed over the course of the series, leading to many of the conflicts that drove the plot of each episode. Other plots revolved around political clashes between the conservative Courtney and the liberal Mavis; customer prejudice against the Persian Nasim, who was often mistaken for an Arab; and the all-female poker group that Mavis and Rita belong to.

Cast

Main
 Whoopi Goldberg as Mavis Rae
 Wren T. Brown as Courtney Rae
 Elizabeth Regen as Rita Nash
 Omid Djalili as Nasim

Recurring

 Gordana Rashovich as Jadwiga
 Mary Testa as Sophia
 MaryAnn Hu as Soo Lin
 Danielle Lee Greaves as Danielle

Notable guest stars
 Enrico Colantoni as Victor the appliance salesman ("Pilot")
 Anson Carter, Scott Gomez, Darius Kasparaitis, Jay Pandolfo, and Scott Stevens as themselves ("Smoke Gets in Your Eyes")
 Sheryl Lee Ralph as Florence Lamarck, Mavis' former bandmate ("She Ain't Heavy, She's My Partner")
 Diahann Carroll as Viveca Rae, Mavis and Courtney's mother ("Mother's Little Helper")
 Rue McClanahan and Eli Wallach as hotel guests using marijuana with a group of "ill" seniors ("American Woman")
 Wallach had previously worked with Goldberg in 1996's The Associate.
 Patrick Swayze as Tony, Mavis' former choreographer and lover ("The Last Dance")
 Celeste Holm as Diana, an elderly tenant of the hotel ("The Squatter")
 Krysten Ritter as Brynn, Diana's granddaughter ("The Squatter")
 Joe Morton as Martin James, an assemblyman whom Courtney challenges ("Sins of the Sister")

Episodes

Production
The series was filmed at Kaufman Astoria Studios in Queens.

Reception and cancellation
The debut episode of Whoopi drew 15.1 million viewers, and was ranked number four for the week. However, the show received negative reviews from critics. This led to steadily declining ratings, and its eventual cancellation by NBC in May 2004.

References

External links
 Official NBC site for Whoopi
 Carsey-Werner – Whoopi
 

2000s American sitcoms
2003 American television series debuts
2004 American television series endings
English-language television shows
NBC original programming
Television series by Carsey-Werner Productions
Television series created by Bonnie and Terry Turner
Television series set in hotels
Television shows filmed in New York City
Television shows set in Manhattan